James A. Owen is an American comic book illustrator, publisher and writer. He is known for his creator-owned comic book series Starchild and as the author of The Chronicles of the Imaginarium Geographica novel series, that began with Here, There Be Dragons in 2006.

Career

Owen self-published the black-and-white fantasy series Starchild  under his Taliesin Press imprint in the 1990s. Adopting the name Coppervale Press for Starchild: Crossroads, he gave up self publishing in 1997 for Starchild: Mythopolis, five issues of which were published by Image Comics. Owen returned to self publishing, compiling a volume of Starchild reprints via a Kickstarter campaign in 2015.

Later, Owen reinvented himself as a novelist, creating a fantasy series titled Mythworld for a German publishing company. The books were later reprinted in the United States by Baen.

In 2003, Coppervale Press relaunched two newsstand style magazines, the fine arts-oriented International Studio and the fiction periodical Argosy, but both magazines ceased publication in 2004 after only a few issues. In 2009, a satirical short story by Jeff VanDermeer entitled "Errata" about Argosy and its demise was published by Tor Books.

In 2006 his novel Here, There Be Dragons was published, the first book in The Chronicles of the Imaginarium Geographica series. The book had multiple printings, and was published around the world in more than twenty languages. It was followed by The Search for the Red Dragon and The Indigo King in 2008, The Shadow Dragons in 2009, The Dragon's Apprentice 2010, The Dragons of Winter in 2012, and "The First Dragon" in 2013.

After releasing a non-fiction ebook of personal stories, in early 2011, Owen had a successful Kickstarter project raising funds to create a limited first edition paperback and hard cover, as well as an audio version of the ebook.

Owen announced  trilogy was picked up by Shadow Mountain Publishing but as of 2021, his work was out of print at the company.

Works 
 .

Starchild
0. .
1. .
2. .
3. .
4. .
5. .
6. .
7. .
8. .
9. .
10. .
11. .
12. .
  (retelling of the previous Starchild books).

Starchild: Crossroads
 .
 .
 .
 .

Starchild: Mythopolis
0. .
1. 
2. .
3. .
4. .

Starchild: Mythopolis II
 .
 .

Kai Meyers Mythenwelt (DE)
 .
 .
 .
 .

The Chronicles of the Imaginarium Geographica
 .
 .
 .
 .
 .
 .
 .
 .

The Meditations
 .
 .
 .

Fool's Hollow
 .

References 

Other sources
 "James A. Owen" biography at the Grand Comics Database (archived 2017-07-08)

External links

 
  (2018-01-01)
 
 

20th-century American novelists
21st-century American novelists
American children's writers
American fantasy writers
American male novelists
Novelists from Arizona
Living people
Writers of modern Arthurian fiction
20th-century American male writers
21st-century American male writers
1969 births